Riverton Parke Jr.-Sr. High School is a public high school in Montezuma, Indiana.

About
Riverton Parke Junior-Senior High School was created from the consolidation of former high schools in western and southern Parke County, Indiana, Rosedale High School, Mecca High School, Bridgeton High School, and Montezuma High School.

Campus
The school is surrounded by forests and fields. There is a football field, softball field, and baseball field, along with many paths around the school to hike upon.

Curriculum
The Panthers have a spell bowl team, a math bowl team, and many other academic teams. The spell bowl team has been successful with multiple visits to the State Championships.  In 2018 the Panthers captured the State Championship on the campus of Purdue University.

Athletics
The Riverton Parke Panthers compete in 7 varsity sports including baseball, basketball, bowling, cheerleading, cross country, football, track & field, and volleyball, but are mostly known for their softball team that has won more than 12 sectional titles and a state title in Class A in 2010.

See also
 List of high schools in Indiana

References

External links
 Riverton Parke Jr.-Sr. High School
 

Educational institutions established in 1986
Public middle schools in Indiana
Public high schools in Indiana
Education in Parke County, Indiana
Buildings and structures in Parke County, Indiana
1986 establishments in Indiana